Chubutisaurus (meaning "Chubut lizard") is a genus of dinosaur from the Early Cretaceous Period. It lived in South America. It is classified as a sauropod, specifically one of the titanosaurs. The type species, Chubutisaurus insignis, was described by del Corro in 1975. Its fossils were found in the Cerro Barcino Formation, Albian stage, about 110 million years ago. Chubutisaurus had a more robust radius than Venenosaurus. In 2010 Gregory Paul gave a length of 18 meters (59 ft) and a weight of 12 tonnes (13.2 short tons). Thomas Holtz estimated its length at 23 meters (75.5 ft) in 2012.

References

Bibliography 
 Tidwell, V., Carpenter, K. & Meyer, S. 2001. New Titanosauriform (Sauropoda) from the Poison Strip Member of the Cedar Mountain Formation (Lower Cretaceous), Utah. In: Mesozoic Vertebrate Life. D. H. Tanke & K. Carpenter (eds.). Indiana University Press, Eds. D.H. Tanke & K. Carpenter. Indiana University Press. 139–165.
 Weishampel, David B; et al. (2004). "Dinosaur distribution (Early Cretaceous, South America)." In: Weishampel, David B.; Dodson, Peter; and Osmólska, Halszka (eds.): The Dinosauria, 2nd, Berkeley: University of California Press. pp. 563–570. .

External links 
 
 Chubutisaurus in the Paleobiology Database
 Chubutisaurus in the Dino Directory

Titanosaurs
Albian life
Early Cretaceous dinosaurs of South America
Cretaceous Argentina
Fossils of Argentina
Cerro Barcino Formation
Fossil taxa described in 1975